Likely (formerly, South Fork) is a census-designated place in Modoc County, California. Its population is 53 as of the 2020 census, down from 63 at the time of the 2010 census. The ZIP Code for the community is 96116.

Geography
Fragments of the southern edge of the Modoc Plateau surround Likely on most sides.

History 
Likely now occupies what was originally an Achumawi (Pit River) village known as Hamawe or Hammawi.  The town was initially known as South Fork, named after the South Fork of the Pit River, and was renamed at the insistence of the United States Post Office, which insisted at that time that Post Offices could only have short, unique names.  Residents were unable to agree what to name their town until a local rancher observed that they would most likely never agree upon a name, at which point someone nominated the name, "Likely", and the name was voted in.  The South Fork post office operated from 1878 to 1882. The Likely post office opened in 1886.

One of the last of the American Indian Wars was fought at Infernal Caverns, a short distance from Likely.

A 1913 book described Likely as having a population of 75, and situated along the main automobile route from Madeline to Bayley.

The Likely Peat Moss Company, Radel Inc. operated in Likely until 1987 when the non-renewing supply of high quality hypnum peat moss in nearby Jess Valley was depleted. The peat moss was strip-mined from the floor of Jess Valley and trucked 13 miles to Likely on the winding canyon road paralleling South Fork Pit River between Likely and Ivy, California. The peat moss was processed and packaged and then shipped by both truck and by Southern Pacific Railroad until rail services to Likely were discontinued. The company, Radel, was dissolved in 1987 upon the owner's retirement.

Geography
According to the United States Census Bureau, the CDP covers an area of 1.3 square miles (3.5 km), with 99.66% land, and 0.34% water.

Demographics

The 2010 United States Census reported that Likely had a population of 63. The racial makeup of Likely was 57 (90.5%) White, 0 (0.0%) African American, 5 (7.9%) Native American, 0 (0.0%) Asian, 0 (0.0%) Pacific Islander, 0 (0.0%) from other races, and 1 (1.6%) from two or more races. Hispanic or Latino of any race were 6 persons (9.5%).

The Census reported that 63 people (100% of the population) lived in households, 0 (0%) lived in non-institutionalized group quarters, and 0 (0%) were institutionalized.

There were 34 households, out of which 4 (11.8%) had children under the age of 18 living in them, 17 (50.0%) were opposite-sex married couples living together, 3 (8.8%) had a female householder with no husband present, 1 (2.9%) had a male householder with no wife present.  There were 1 (2.9%) unmarried opposite-sex partnerships, and 0 (0%) same-sex married couples or partnerships. 11 households (32.4%) were made up of individuals, and 8 (23.5%) had someone living alone who was 65 years of age or older. The average household size was 1.85.  There were 21 families (61.8% of all households); the average family size was 2.29.

The population was spread out, with 5 people (7.9%) under the age of 18, 2 people (3.2%) aged 18 to 24, 7 people (11.1%) aged 25 to 44, 24 people (38.1%) aged 45 to 64, and 25 people (39.7%) who were 65 years of age or older.  The median age was 59.1 years. For every 100 females, there were 103.2 males.  For every 100 females age 18 and over, there were 100.0 males.

The homeowner vacancy rate was 0%; the rental vacancy rate was 37.5%.  55 people (87.3% of the population) lived in owner-occupied housing units and 8 people (12.7%) lived in rental housing units.

Politics

Economy 

The primary industries of Likely and its surroundings are currently ranching and tourism.  A long-running joke among residents is that the Gross National Product of this part of Modoc County is your choice of: rocks, junipers, or sagebrush.

Local, State, Federal, and Tribal governments are the largest employers in Modoc.  Timber and peat moss industries collapsed in the 1980s due to increased costs and loss of railroad infrastructure.

Internet access in Likely is limited to dial-up service, provided by High Desert Online and Frontier Communications.

See also
 Likely Rancheria

Notes

External links
h2g2 Guide Entry A1065278: Modoc County, California, USA
A Likely Death

Census-designated places in Modoc County, California
Census-designated places in California